George Penfield Shears (April 13, 1890 – November 12, 1978) was a Major League Baseball pitcher. In 1912, Shears played for the New York Highlanders. In 4 career games, he had a 0–0 record, with a 5.40 ERA. He batted right-handed and threw left-handed.

George Shears was a Doctor of Chiropractic who led the G.P.C. chiropractic movement in the late 1930s, 1940s and early 1950s. Shears was born in Marshall, Missouri, and died in Loveland, Colorado.

References

External links

1890 births
1978 deaths
New York Highlanders players
Major League Baseball pitchers
Baseball players from Missouri
Paris Bourbonites players
Brockton Shoemakers players
Hamilton Hams players
Jersey City Skeeters players
Erie Sailors players
Lawrence Barristers players
Moline Plowboys players
People from Marshall, Missouri